Catherine Augusta Francis (16 September 1836–19 October 1916) was a New Zealand teacher and headmistress. She was born in London, London, England on 16 September 1836.

References

1836 births
1916 deaths
Heads of schools in New Zealand
19th-century  New Zealand educators